Leptothelaira is a genus of flies in the family Tachinidae.

Species
Leptothelaira latistriata Shima, 1988
Leptothelaira longicaudata Mesnil & Shima, 1979
Leptothelaira longipennis Zhang, Wang & Liu, 2006
Leptothelaira meridionalis Mesnil & Shima, 1979
Leptothelaira orientalis Mesnil & Shima, 1979

References

Diptera of Asia
Dexiinae
Tachinidae genera